Miramichi Airport  is located  south of Miramichi, New Brunswick, Canada.

It has a pavement overlay (from 1998), new approach lights and a new taxiway. The airport is the home base of the Department of Natural Resources and Energy Air Tanker Operations, and Forest Protection Limited, who own and operate the air tanker fleet. In addition, a General Electric J85 engine test facility is located at the airport.

The airport is the former site of CFB Chatham, a military air base, which closed in 1996, after military units were moved to other bases. There is one abandoned runway within the airport which is still used for local glider operations. The two southern runways (04/22 and 15/33) were truncated by the southern boundary fence parallel to the main runway and one (15/33) was used as a drag strip and the other (04/22) is an industrial area but the current status is unknown. The top of 04/22 is now taxiway 'B' which was where the ready hangars for the McDonnell CF-101 Voodoos were, leading to the threshold of runway 27.

Runways

Since the closure of the airbase, the airport only has one runway operational for aircraft and one closed runway for glider use only.

 09/27 -  - asphalt lighted - operational

Closed

The three former runways were paved and marked to indicate their closure or non-use.

 04/22 –  - truncated at airport fence - closed 
 10/28 –  - glider only
 15/33 –  - truncated at airport fence - converted to drag strip

Airlines and destinations

Cargo airlines

References

 Airport diagrams Navcanada page 628

Certified airports in New Brunswick
Buildings and structures in Miramichi, New Brunswick
Transport in Miramichi, New Brunswick